Jamwanthali railway station is a railway station on the Western Railway network in the state of Gujarat, India. Jamwanthali railway station is 31 km far away from Jamnagar railway station. Passenger and Superfast trains halt at Jamwanthali railway station.

Nearby stations 

Aliyavada is nearest railway station towards , whereas Jaliya Devani is nearest railway station towards .

Trains 

The following Express/Superfast trains halt at Jamwanthali railway station in both directions:

 22945/46 Saurashtra Mail
 22959/60 Surat–Jamnagar Intercity Express

See also
 Jamnagar district

References

Railway stations in Jamnagar district
Rajkot railway division